Peter Purden was a Scottish soccer inside right who played professionally in both Scotland and the United States. He began his professional career with Galston in Scotland before moving to the United States. The exact order of his U.S. career is difficult to follow. He appears to have played briefly with Bethlehem Steel, scored the second goal, a penalty kick, in the Shawsheen Indians 3–0 victory over the Chicago Canadian Club in the 1925 National Challenge Cup and played one game with the Fall River Marksmen of the American Soccer League during the 1924–1925 season.

References

Scottish footballers
Galston F.C. players
American Soccer League (1921–1933) players
Fall River Marksmen players
Bethlehem Steel F.C. (1907–1930) players
Shawsheen Indians players
Year of birth missing
Year of death missing
Place of birth missing
Association football forwards
Scottish expatriate sportspeople in the United States
Expatriate soccer players in the United States
Scottish expatriate footballers